Year 1086 (MLXXXVI) was a common year starting on Thursday (link will display the full calendar) of the Julian calendar.

Events 
 By place 

 Europe 
 October 23 – Battle of Sagrajas: Spanish forces under King Alfonso VI (the Brave) of Castile are defeated by the Moors and their allies, the Almoravids, who had been invited to help on orders by Emir Abbad III.
 Norman forces under Count Roger I (Bosso) conquer Syracuse, the last Muslim stronghold in Sicily.

 England 
 August 1 – King William I (the Conqueror) calls for a meeting at Old Sarum, where he invites his major vassals and tenants-in-chief to swear allegiance to him. The oath is known as the Oath of Salisbury.
 The Domesday Book is completed, which is drawn up on the orders of William I. It describes in detail the landholdings and resources in England.
 The population in England is estimated to be 1.25 million citizens with 10% living in boroughs.

 Seljuk Empire 
 Summer – Suleiman ibn Qutulmish, ruler of the Rum Sultanate, is killed by Emir Tutush I near Antioch. Suleiman's 7-year-old son Kilij Arslan is captured and transferred as hostage to Isfahan (modern Iran).
 Sultan Malik-Shah I rebuilds the Imam Ali Mosque in Najaf (modern Iraq), after it was destroyed by fire.

 By topic 

 Religion 
 May 24 – Pope Victor III succeeds Gregory VII as the 158th pope of the Catholic Church, though he does not accept election until 1087.

Births 
 April 24 – Ramiro II (the Monk), king of Aragon (d. 1157)
 August 11 – Henry V, Holy Roman Emperor (d. 1125)
 August 20 – Bolesław III, duke of Poland (d. 1138)
 Al-Shahrastani, Persian scholar and historian (d. 1153)
 Þorlákur Runólfsson, Icelandic bishop (d. 1133)
 Vicelinus, bishop of Oldenburg in Holstein (d. 1154)
 Zhang Jun, Chinese general and official (d. 1154)

Deaths 
 March 15 – Richilde, countess and regent of Flanders
 March 18 – Anselm of Lucca, Italian bishop (b. 1036)
 May 21 – Wang Anshi, Chinese chancellor (b. 1021)
 July 10 – Canute IV (the Holy), king of Denmark
 July 14 – Toirdelbach Ua Briain, Irish king (b. 1009)
 July 17 – García Ramírez, Aragonese bishop
 August 8 – Conrad I, count of Luxembourg (b. 1040)
 September 25 – William VIII, duke of Aquitaine
 October 11 – Sima Guang, Chinese politician (b. 1019)
 October 23 – Rodrigo Muñoz, Galician nobleman
 December 25 – Judith of Bohemia, duchess of Poland
 Gregory Pakourianos, Byzantine politician and general 
 Hui Zong, Chinese emperor (Western Xia) (b. 1060)
 Mael Ísu Ua Brolcháin, Irish monk and writer
 Muhammad ibn Ammar, Moorish poet (b. 1031)
 Odo I (or Eudes), French nobleman (b. 1040)
 Suleiman ibn Qutulmish, ruler of the Rum Sultanate

References